In chemistry, a phosphate is an anion, salt, functional group or ester derived from a phosphoric acid.  It most commonly means orthophosphate, a derivative of orthophosphoric acid, aka. phosphoric acid .

The phosphate or orthophosphate ion  is derived from phosphoric acid by the removal of three protons .  Removal of one or two protons gives the dihydrogen phosphate ion  and the hydrogen phosphate ion  ion, respectively.  These names are also used for salts of those anions, such as ammonium dihydrogen phosphate and trisodium phosphate.

In organic chemistry, phosphate or orthophosphate is an organophosphate, an ester of orthophosphoric acid of the form  where one or more hydrogen atoms are replaced by organic groups. An example is trimethyl phosphate, .  The term also refers to the trivalent functional group  in such esters.

Orthophosphates are especially important among the various phosphates because of their key roles in biochemistry, biogeochemistry, and ecology, and their economic importance for agriculture and industry.  The addition and removal of phosphate groups (phosphorylation and dephosphorylation) are key steps in cell metabolism.

Orthophosphates can condense to form pyrophosphates.

Chemical properties
The phosphate ion has a molar mass of 94.97 g/mol, and consists of a central phosphorus atom surrounded by four oxygen atoms in a tetrahedral arrangement. It is the conjugate base of the hydrogen phosphate ion , which in turn is the conjugate base of the dihydrogen phosphate ion , which in turn is the conjugate base of orthophosphoric acid, .

Many phosphates are soluble in water at standard temperature and pressure. The sodium, potassium, rubidium, caesium, and ammonium phosphates are all water-soluble. Most other phosphates are only slightly soluble or are insoluble in water. As a rule, the hydrogen and dihydrogen phosphates are slightly more soluble than the corresponding phosphates.

Equilibria in solution

In water solution, orthophosphoric acid and its three derived anions coexist according to the dissociation and recombination equilibria below

Values are at 25°C and 0 ionic strength.

The pKa values are the pH values where the concentration of each species is equal to that of its conjugate bases.  At pH 1 or lower, the phosphoric acid is practically undissociated.  Around pH 4.7 (mid-way between the first two pKa values) the dihydrogen phosphate ion, is practically the only species present.  Around pH 9.8 (mid-way between the second and third pKa values) the monohydrogen phosphate ion, is the only species present. At pH 13 or higher, the acid is completely dissociated as the phosphate ion, .

This means that salts of the mono- and di-phosphate ions can be selectively crystallised from aqueous solution by setting the pH value to either 4.7 or 9.8.

In effect,  and  behave as separate weak acids because the successive pKa differ by more than 4.

Phosphate can form many polymeric ions such as pyrophosphate, and triphosphate, .

Biochemistry of phosphates

In biological systems, phosphorus can be found as free phosphate anions in solution (inorganic phosphate) or bound to organic molecules as various organophosphates.

At a neutral pH, as in the cytosol (pH = 7.0), the concentrations of the orthophoshoric acid and its three anions have the ratios
 [  ] / [  ] ≈ 7.5 × 104
 [  ] / [  ] ≈ 0.62
 [  ] / [  ] ≈ 2.14 × 10−6
Thus, only  and  ions are present in significant amounts in the cytosol (62% , 38% ). In extracellular fluid (pH = 7.4), this proportion is inverted (61% , 39% ).

Inorganic phosphate can be present also as of pyrophosphate anions , which can give orthophosphate by hydrolysis:

 + H2O  2 

Organic phosphates are commonly found in the form of esters as nucleotides (e.g. AMP, ADP, and ATP) and in DNA and RNA. Free orthophosphate anions can be released by the hydrolysis of the phosphoanhydride bonds in ATP or ADP. These phosphorylation and dephosphorylation reactions are the immediate storage and source of energy for many metabolic processes. ATP and ADP are often referred to as high-energy phosphates, as are the phosphagens in muscle tissue.  Similar reactions exist for the other nucleoside diphosphates and triphosphates.

Bones and teeth
An important occurrence of phosphates in biological systems is as the structural material of bone and teeth. These structures are made of crystalline calcium phosphate in the form of hydroxyapatite. The hard dense enamel of mammalian teeth may contain fluoroapatite, a hydroxy calcium phosphate where some of the hydroxyl groups have been replaced by fluoride ions.

Medical and biological research uses
Phosphates are medicinal salts of phosphorus. Some phosphates, which help cure many urinary tract infections, are used to make urine more acidic. To avoid the development of calcium stones in the urinary tract, some phosphates are used. For patients who are unable to get enough phosphorus in their daily diet, phosphates are used as dietary supplements, usually because of certain disorders or diseases. Injectable phosphates can only be handled by qualified health care providers.

Plant metabolism
Plants take up phosphorus through several pathways: the arbuscular mycorrhizal pathway and the direct uptake pathway.

Adverse health effects 

Hyperphosphatemia, or a high blood level of phosphates, is associated with elevated mortality in the general population. Hyperphosphatemia is generally caused by phosphate food additives, as phosphates that are naturally present in food are not completely absorbed by the gastrointestinal tract. Phosphates induce vascular calcification, and a high concentration of phosphates in blood was found to be a predictor of cardiovascular events.

Phosphates are commonly used as additives in industrially processed food and fast food. Fast food and ready-to-eat processed foods are the main contributors of the rising consumption of phosphate among the population. Phosphates additives are also commonly found in flavoured soft drinks as well as certain dairy products.

Production

Geological occurrence

Phosphates are the naturally occurring form of the element phosphorus, found in many phosphate minerals. In mineralogy and geology, phosphate refers to a rock or ore containing phosphate ions. Inorganic phosphates are mined to obtain phosphorus for use in agriculture and industry.

The largest global producer and exporter of phosphates is Morocco. Within North America, the largest deposits lie in the Bone Valley region of central Florida, the Soda Springs region of southeastern Idaho, and the coast of North Carolina. Smaller deposits are located in Montana, Tennessee, Georgia, and South Carolina. The small island nation of Nauru and its neighbor Banaba Island, which used to have massive phosphate deposits of the best quality, have been mined excessively. Rock phosphate can also be found in Egypt, Israel, Palestine, Western Sahara, Navassa Island, Tunisia, Togo, and Jordan, countries that have large phosphate-mining industries.

Phosphorite mines are primarily found in:
 North America:  United States, especially Florida, with lesser deposits in North Carolina, Idaho, and Tennessee
 Africa: Morocco, Algeria, Egypt, Niger, Senegal, Togo, Tunisia, Mauritania
 Middle East: Saudi Arabia, Jordan, Israel, Syria, Iran and Iraq, at the town of Akashat, near the Jordanian border.
 Central Asia: Kazakhstan
 Oceania: Australia, Makatea, Nauru, and Banaba Island

In 2007, at the current rate of consumption, the supply of phosphorus was estimated to run out in 345 years. However, some scientists thought that a "peak phosphorus" would occur in 30 years and Dana Cordell from Institute for Sustainable Futures said  that at "current rates, reserves will be depleted in the next 50 to 100 years". Reserves refer to the amount assumed recoverable at current market prices. In 2012 the USGS estimated world reserves at 71 billion tons, while 0.19 billion tons were mined globally in 2011.  Phosphorus comprises 0.1% by mass of the average rock (while, for perspective, its typical concentration in vegetation is 0.03% to 0.2%), and consequently there are quadrillions of tons of phosphorus in Earth's 3×1019-ton crust, albeit at predominantly lower concentration than the deposits counted as reserves, which are inventoried and cheaper to extract. If it is assumed that the phosphate minerals in phosphate rock are mainly hydroxyapatite and fluoroapatite, phosphate minerals contain roughly 18.5% phosphorus by weight. If phosphate rock contains around 20% of these minerals, the average phosphate rock has roughly 3.7% phosphorus by weight.

Some phosphate rock deposits, such as Mulberry in Florida, are notable for their inclusion of significant quantities of radioactive uranium isotopes. This is a concern because radioactivity can be released into surface waters from application of the resulting phosphate fertilizer.

In December 2012, Cominco Resources announced an updated JORC compliant resource of their Hinda project in Congo-Brazzaville of 531 million tons, making it the largest measured and indicated phosphate deposit in the world.

In July 2022 China announced quotas on phosphate exportation.

The largest importers in millions of metric tons of phosphate are Brazil 3.2, India 2.9 and the USA 1.6.

Mining
The three principal phosphate producer countries (China, Morocco and the United States) account for about 70% of world production.

Ecology 

In ecological terms, because of its important role in biological systems, phosphate is a highly sought after resource. Once used, it is often a limiting nutrient in environments, and its availability may govern the rate of growth of organisms. This is generally true of freshwater environments, whereas nitrogen is more often the limiting nutrient in marine (seawater) environments. Addition of high levels of phosphate to environments and to micro-environments in which it is typically rare can have significant ecological consequences. For example, blooms in the populations of some organisms at the expense of others, and the collapse of populations deprived of resources such as oxygen (see eutrophication) can occur. In the context of pollution, phosphates are one component of total dissolved solids, a major indicator of water quality, but not all phosphorus is in a molecular form that algae can break down and consume.

Calcium hydroxyapatite and calcite precipitates can be found around bacteria in alluvial topsoil. As clay minerals promote biomineralization, the presence of bacteria and clay minerals resulted in calcium hydroxyapatite and calcite precipitates.

Phosphate deposits can contain significant amounts of naturally occurring heavy metals. Mining operations processing phosphate rock can leave tailings piles containing elevated levels of cadmium, lead, nickel, copper, chromium, and uranium. Unless carefully managed, these waste products can leach heavy metals into groundwater or nearby estuaries. Uptake of these substances by plants and marine life can lead to concentration of toxic heavy metals in food products.

See also

 Diammonium phosphate - (NH4)2HPO4
 Disodium phosphate – Na2HPO4
 Fertilizer
 Hypophosphite – 
 Metaphosphate – 
 Monosodium phosphate – NaH2PO4
 Organophosphorus compounds
 Ouled Abdoun Basin
 Phosphate – OP(OR)3, such as triphenyl phosphate
 Phosphate conversion coating
 Phosphate soda, a soda fountain beverage
 Phosphinate – OP(OR)R2
 Phosphine – PR3
 Phosphine oxide – OPR3
 Phosphinite – P(OR)R2
 Phosphite – P(OR)3
 Phosphogypsum
 Phosphonate – OP(OR)2R
 Phosphonite – P(OR)2R
 Phosphorylation
 Polyphosphate – 
 Pyrophosphate – 
 Sodium tripolyphosphate – Na5P3O10

References

External links

 US Minerals Databrowser provides data graphics covering consumption, production, imports, exports and price for phosphate and 86 other minerals
 Phosphate: analyte monograph – The Association for Clinical Biochemistry and Laboratory Medicine

Functional groups
Phosphorus oxyanions
 
Industrial minerals
Concrete admixtures
Phosphorus(V) compounds